Joël Billard (born 21 March 1953) is a former member of the Senate of France, who represented the Eure-et-Loir department.  He is a member of the Union for a Popular Movement.

References
Page on the Senate website 

1953 births
Living people
Liberal Democracy (France) politicians
Union for a Popular Movement politicians
The Strong Right
The Social Right
Modern and Humanist France
French Senators of the Fifth Republic
Senators of Eure-et-Loir